Wallago hexanema is a species of catfish in the family Siluridae (the sheatfishes), native to Asia.

References

Siluridae